Pseudohermenias ajanensis is a species of moth of the family Tortricidae. It is found in the Russian Far East, China and Japan.

The wingspan is about 16 mm. Adults are on wing from July to August.

The larvae feed on Picea jezoensis and Abies species.

References

Moths described in 1966
Olethreutini
Moths of Japan